Ukraine participated in the Junior Eurovision Song Contest 2020, which was held in Warsaw, Poland, with the song "Vidkryvai" performed by Oleksandr Balabanov. Their entrant was selected through a national selection, organised by the Ukrainian broadcaster UA:PBC.

Background 

In the  contest, Sophia Ivanko represented her country in Gliwice, Poland with the song the "Spirit of Music". She placed 15th out of 19 entries with 59 points.

Before Junior Eurovision

National final 
UA:PBC announced that they would be participating at the 2020 contest in June of that year. The broadcaster launched the Ukrainian selection process on 5 August 2020, accepting submissions until 25 August 2020. All applications that complied with the rules were uploaded on YouTube and the candidate that had received the most likes on the platform advanced automatically to the next stage of the program. The final shortlist was announced on 28 August 2020 with an online vote due to open a week later on 5 September 2020 to decide the winning entry alongside a professional jury.

Competing entries 
The submissions accepted by UA:PBC were revealed online and users had until 27 August 2020 to vote for their favourite entries by giving a like. The entry with the most likes directly advanced to the national final. A selection panel then reviewed the remaining submissions and selected ten entries to compete in the national final: eight original songs and two cover songs. On 18 August 2020, Maksym Tkachuk was disqualified from the competition as it was discovered that he had performed in the Autonomous Republic of Crimea after its annexation as part of a competition allegedly organised by the Russian Foreign Affairs Ministry, breaching the Section 3.4. on the national selection's rules. On 28 August 2020, the eleven selected competing acts were announced on Instagram.

Final 
The eleven competing entries were be published online on 5 September 2020 and the winner was be selected through the combination of both public online vote and the votes of jury members made up of music professionals. Eight jury members each awarded one vote to their favourite entry and each member had an equal stake in the final result. The jury panel that was responsible for 8/9 of the final result consisted of: Jamala (winner of the Eurovision Song Contest 2016), Alina Pash (singer, rapper), Taras Topolya (lead vocalist of Antytila), Ruslana Khazipova (member of Dakh Daughters), Dmytro Shurov (lead vocalist of Pianoboy), Larysa Klyuyevska (music editor at UA:Radio Promin), Timur Miroshnychenko (television presenter, Junior Eurovision commentator for Ukraine), Lyubov Morozova (music critic, host at UA:Kultura). For the online vote, users will be able to vote for their favourite entries from 5 September 2020 to 8 September 2020 via UA:PBC's official website junior.eurovision.ua, and the results had a weighting equal to the votes of a single jury member. Originally, the winner was to be revealed on 12 September 2020. However, UA:PBC confirmed through its official Instagram account that Oleksandr Balabanov will represent Ukraine at the Junior Eurovision Song Contest 2020. He received 5 points in total from the jurors, with Daniela Shapochnikova winning the online voting.

Artist and song information

Oleksandr Balabanov 
Oleksandr Balabanov (born 5 July 2006) is a Ukrainian singer. He represented Ukraine at the Junior Eurovision Song Contest 2020 with the song "Vidkryvai".

Vidkryvai (Open Up) 
"Vidkryvai (Open Up)" is a song by Ukrainian singer Oleksandr Balabanov. It represented Ukraine at the Junior Eurovision Song Contest 2020.

At Junior Eurovision
After the opening ceremony, which took place on 23 November 2020, it was announced that Ukraine will perform eleventh on 29 November 2020, following Spain and preceding France.

Voting

Ukraine received 106 points; 52 from the juries and 54 from online voting, reaching 7th place.

Detailed voting results

Notes

References 

Junior Eurovision Song Contest
Ukraine
2020